Antonella Rosa (1 February 1957 – 2020) was an Italian professional tennis player.

Rosa, a native of the Liguria region of Italy, had an unusual technique of using a forehand on both sides of her body. She stopped hitting a backhand on the recommendation of a coach, due to an injury sustained to her right hand.

While competing on tour in the 1970s she was at her height the fourth ranked player in Italy. She reached the third round of the 1976 French Open and was a doubles bronze medalist at the 1979 Mediterranean Games.

References

External links
 

1957 births
2020 deaths
Italian female tennis players
Sportspeople from Liguria
Mediterranean Games medalists in tennis
Mediterranean Games bronze medalists for Italy
Competitors at the 1979 Mediterranean Games
20th-century Italian women